The Roman Catholic Diocese of Villa de la Concepción del Río Cuarto is located in the village of Concepción in the city of Río Cuarto, in the province of Córdoba, Argentina.

History
On 20 April 1934, Pope Pius XI established the Diocese of Río Cuarto from the Diocese of Córdoba.  Its name was changed to the Diocese of Villa de la Concepción del Río Cuarto on 12 July 1995.

Bishops

Ordinaries
Leopoldo Buteler (1934–1961)
Moisés Julio Blanchoud (1962–1984), appointed Archbishop of Salta
Adolfo Roque Esteban Arana (1984–1992)
Ramón Artemio Staffolani (1992–2006)
Eduardo Eliseo Martín (2006–2014), appointed Archbishop of Rosario
Adolfo Armando Uriona (2014-

Coadjutor bishop
Ramón Artemio Staffolani (1990-1992)

Auxiliary bishop
Moisés Julio Blanchoud (1960–1982), appointed Bishop here

Other priests of this diocese who became bishops
Carlos José Tissera, appointed Bishop of San Francisco in 2004
Victor Manuel Fernández, appointed titular Archbishop in 2013
Hugo Ricardo Araya, appointed Bishop of Cruz del Eje in 2017

References

Roman Catholic dioceses in Argentina
Roman Catholic Ecclesiastical Province of Córdoba
Christian organizations established in 1934
Roman Catholic dioceses and prelatures established in the 20th century